Jozsef Lendvay (born 1974) is a Hungarian violinist.

Born in Budapest, Hungary, József Lendvay Jr (son of famed Gypsy Violinist József "Csócsi" Lendvay) attended Béla Bartók Conservatory in Budapest, where he studied with Miklos Szenthelyi and later the Franz Liszt Academy of Music in Budapest.  His recordings include works by Sarasate and Brahms' Hungarian Dances with Iván Fischer. Lendvay has won first prize at the Köln International Violin Competition, the Ferenc Liszt Heritage Award presented by Hungary's Ministry of National Culture, and the Tibor Varga International Violin competition, among others. In 2002 he was awarded the Golden Cross for his musical contributions by the president of the Hungarian Republic.

References

External links
Website of Jozsef Lendvay ( in Poland)
Website of Jozsef Lendvay (in German)

1974 births
Living people
Musicians from Budapest
Hungarian violinists
Male violinists
21st-century violinists
21st-century Hungarian male musicians